O Night Divine is a 1999 album by Trace Bundy.  It comprises raw acoustic instrumental arrangements of Christmas songs. The album was re-released in September 2003.

Track listing

References

External links
Official Trace Bundy Web site
Canon-Acoustic

Trace Bundy albums
1999 albums